Egerton Dodge Cooper Cecil (4 July 1853 – 25 September 1928) was an English cricketer. He was a right-handed batsman who played for Hampshire.

Cecil made his only first-class appearance during the 1875 season for Hampshire against Kent. Cecil scored 4 runs in his only innings in which he batted and bowled three wicketless overs during the Kent innings. Cecil was retired absent in Hampshire's second innings.

Cecil died in Mortlake, Surrey on 25 September 1928.

Family
Cecil's brother Aubrey Cecil also represented Hampshire in a single first-class match in 1876.

External links
Egerton Cecil at Cricinfo
Egerton Cecil at CricketArchive

1853 births
1928 deaths
English cricketers
Hampshire cricketers
Sportspeople from Worthing